Sacha Dean Bïyan is a photographer, photojournalist and  author best known for his photography, which ranges from fashion and advertising to poetic impressions of traditional cultures around the world.

Early life 
Sacha Dean Bïyan was born on October 1, 1967, and grew up mainly in Montreal, Canada. He spent his later formative years in Paris, New York City and Los Angeles, during which he developed his interest in music,  art and photography. Bïyan trained as an engineer, earning a Bachelor’s degree in Robotics and a Master of Science in Aeronautical Engineering. He worked in the aerospace industry prior to becoming a professional photographer. He initially worked in commercial photography before switching to photojournalism and filmmaking.

Work 

Bïyan has shot advertising campaigns, music videos and documentaries for clients such as Sony Music, Adidas, GAP, Lexus, PBS and the Discovery Channel; and his editorial images have appeared in GQ, Maxim, Vogue and Marie Claire.

Bïyan is the author of two fine art books: Spiritus Mundi published in 2005, and Eccentris published in 2012. Spiritus Mundi took nine years to complete, and documents his encounters with remote indigenous cultures in Brazil, Ecuador, Bolivia, Peru, Venezuela, Colombia, the Philippines, India, Bhutan, Nepal, Burma, China, Mongolia, Papua New Guinea, Indonesia and Micronesia. His second book, Eccentris, is a retrospective of his work in fashion and advertising from 1998 to 2006.

Bïyan's images also served as the inspiration for the music CD Dessous Presents Eccentris: Skin Is In, released in 2006 by German house music label Dessous Recordings. Dessous subsequently released the iTunes album Eccentris Vibes, compiled and mixed by Bïyan.

Bibliography 

 2005 : Spiritus Mundi. Editora DBA. Hardcover . Portuguese/English.
 2007 : Spiritus Mundi. Great Circle Books. Paperbound . English.
 2012 : Eccentris. Editions Lumiere. Hardcover . English.

References

External links
 @sachabiyan - Bïyan's Instagram page.
 Sacha Dean Biyan - Bïyan's official website, featuring his fine art, ethnographic, reportage and fashion work.
 Eccentris - Now defunct Flash website. Redirects to Bïyan's official site.

1968 births
Fashion photographers
Living people
American photographers
Anglophone Quebec people
Artists from Montreal